Pescosansonesco is a comune and town in the province of Pescara in the Abruzzo region of Italy.
Before the establishment of Pescosansonesco in the 10th century, there was an ancient settlement, called a pagus. The pre-Roman inhabitants of the area created a sanctuary at Lake Morrone in the 5th century BC.

References

Cities and towns in Abruzzo